Laëtitia Madjene (born 28 August 1986) is a French kickboxer and the current WKN Lightweight champion. At an amateur level, she was the 2015 WAKO Welterweight Lowkick world champion and the WAKO Irish Open Tournament winner.

Kickboxing career
In 2015, Madjene participated in the 2015 WAKO World Amateur Championship. After winning by KO against Yildrim in quarter finals and Veronika Cmárová in the semi finals, she faced Kseniia Miroshichenko in the finals. Madjene won the fight by a unanimous decision.

In 2017, she fought in the Kunlun Fight Mulan Tournament. She won a unanimous decision over Anissa Haddaoui in the semi finals. She would pull out of the fight due to an injury. She was replaced by Haddaoui.

The fight with Wang Kehan was rebooked for Kunlun Fight 69. and was subsequently rebooked for Kunlun Fight 70 after Madjene pulled out with an injury. Kehan won the fight by a unanimous decision.

During Fight Night Saint Tropez 6 Madjene fought Mallaury Kalachnikoff for the WKN Lightweight title. Madjene won a unanimous decision.

Championships and accomplishments

Amateur titles
World Association of Kickboxing Organizations
WAKO Irish Open Tournament Winner
WAKO World Full Contact Welterweight Championship

Professional titles
World Kickboxing Network
WKN World K1 Lightweight Championship

Kickboxing record

|-  bgcolor=
|-  bgcolor="#CCFFCC"
| 4 Aug 2018|| Win||align=left| Mallaury Kalachnikoff || Fight Night Saint-Tropez ||  Saint-Tropez, France || Decision (Unanimous) || 3 || 3:00
|-
! style=background:white colspan=9 |
|-
|-  bgcolor="#FFBBBB"
| 11 Mar 2018|| Loss||align=left| Wang Kehan || Kunlun Fight 70 ||  Sanya, China || Decision (Unanimous) || 3 || 3:00
|-
|-  bgcolor="#CCFFCC"
| 14 May 2017|| Win||align=left| Anissa Haddaoui || Kunlun Fight 61 || Sanya, China || Decision (Unanimous) || 3 || 3:00
|-
! style=background:white colspan=9 |
|-
|-  bgcolor="#CCFFCC"
| 30 Oct 2016|| Win||align=left| Candice Mitchell || Kunlun Fight 54 || Wuhan, China || Decision (Unanimous) || 3 || 3:00
|-
|-  bgcolor="#CCFFCC"
| 4 June 2016|| Win||align=left| Marlene Caneva || 18e Nuit des Titans || Saint-André-les-Vergers, France || TKO || 1 || 3:00
|-
|-  bgcolor="#CCFFCC"
| 19 May 2016|| Win||align=left| Nawel Karouach || Capital Fights || Paris, France || Decision (Unanimous) || 3 || 3:00
|-
|-  bgcolor="#CCFFCC"
| 21 Jan 2016|| Win||align=left| Laurie Catherin || MFC 3 || Seyssins, France || Decision (Unanimous) || 3 || 3:00
|-
|-  bgcolor="#CCFFCC"
| 3 Apr 2015|| Win||align=left| Aurélie Froment || La Nuit des Défis III || Béziers, France || Decision (Unanimous) || 3 || 3:00
|-
|-  bgcolor="#CCFFCC"
| 6 Dec 2014|| Win||align=left| M. Bellod || Full Night VIII || Tokyo, Japan || TKO  (Punches) || 2 || 3:00
|-
|-
| colspan=9 | Legend:    

|-  style="background:#fbb;"
| 5 Mar 2017|| Loss||align=left| Julia Irmen || Irish Open, Tournament Final || Dublin, Ireland || Decision  || 3 || 3:00 
|-
! style=background:white colspan=9 |
|-  style="background:#cfc;"
| 4 Mar 2017|| Win||align=left| Jenna Puurunen || Irish Open, Tournament Semifinal || Dublin, Ireland || Decision  || 3 || 3:00 
|-
|-  style="background:#cfc;"
| 3 Mar 2017|| Win||align=left| Andrea Sigersvold || Irish Open, Tournament Quarterfinal || Dublin, Ireland || Decision  || 3 || 3:00 
|-
|-  style="background:#cfc;"
| 28 Nov 2015|| Win||align=left| Kseniia Miroshichenko || WAKO World Championship, Tournament Final || Dublin, Ireland || Decision  || 3 || 3:00 
|-
! style=background:white colspan=9 |
|-  style="background:#cfc;"
| 27 Nov 2015|| Win||align=left| Veronika Cmárová || WAKO World Championship, Tournament Semifinal || Dublin, Ireland || Decision  || 3 || 3:00 
|-
|-  style="background:#cfc;"
| 26 Nov 2015|| Win||align=left| D. Yildrim || WAKO World Championship, Tournament Quarterfinal || Dublin, Ireland || KO  || 2 || 3:00 
|-
|-  bgcolor="#CCFFCC"
| 8 May 2016|| Win||align=left| P David || French National Championship, Tournament Final || Paris, France || TKO || 2 ||
|-
! style=background:white colspan=9 | 
|-
|-  bgcolor="#CCFFCC"
| 2 May 2016|| Win||align=left| Charlotte Pelte || French National Championship, Tournament Semifinal || Paris, France || TKO (Retirement) || 2 || 3:00
|-
|-  style="background:#cfc;"
| 8 Mar 2015|| Win||align=left| E. Vade || WAKO Irish Open, Tournament Final || Dublin, Ireland || Decision  || 3 || 3:00 
|-
! style=background:white colspan=9 |
|-  style="background:#cfc;"
| 7 Mar 2015|| Win||align=left| Paulina Frankowska || WAKO Irish Open, Tournament Semifinal || Dublin, Ireland || Decision  || 3 || 3:00 
|-
|-  style="background:#cfc;"
| 7 Mar 2015|| Win||align=left| Amanda Ginski || WAKO Irish Open, Tournament Quarterfinals || Dublin, Ireland || Decision  || 3 || 3:00 
|-
|-  bgcolor="#CCFFCC"
| 2 Nov 2014 || Win||align=left| Laëticia Gaydon || French National Championship, Tournament Final || Paris, France || Decision (Unanimous) || 3 || 2:00
|-
! style=background:white colspan=9 | 
|-
|-  bgcolor="#CCFFCC"
| 20 Apr 2014 || Win||align=left| Laëticia Gaydon || French National Cup, Tournament Final || Paris, France || Decision (Unanimous) || 3 || 2:00
|-
! style=background:white colspan=9 | 
|-
|-  style="background:#fbb;"
| 5 Nov 2013 || Loss ||align=left| Sarah Surrel || French National Championship, Tournament Final || Paris, France || Decision (Unanimous) || 3 || 2:00
|-
! style=background:white colspan=9 | 
|-
| colspan=9 | Legend:

See also
List of female kickboxers

References

1986 births
Living people
Sportspeople from Montpellier
French female kickboxers